The following highways are numbered 77A:

United States
 County Road 77A (Bay County, Florida)
 County Road 77A (Washington County, Florida)
 New York State Route 77A (former)
 County Route 77A (Suffolk County, New York)
 Oklahoma State Highway 77A (former)